Little Eccleston-with-Larbreck is a civil parish on the southern bank of the River Wyre on the Fylde in the English county of Lancashire. The population taken at the 2011 census was 400. The Cartford Inn stands at the southern side of the bridge.

The main A586 road runs south of the village of Little Eccleston, dividing it from Great Eccleston. Administratively it forms part of the Borough of Fylde.

Gallery

See also
Listed buildings in Little Eccleston-with-Larbreck

References

External links 

Little Eccleston with Larbreck Parish Council (includes photographs)
Parish council contact details
GENUKI(tm) page

Civil parishes in Lancashire
Geography of the Borough of Fylde